Ilara Yewa is a Nigerian town in the west of Ogun State, Nigeria  about 91 kilometers northwest of Abeokuta. It lies on the border between Nigeria and Benin. Its elevation is 600 feet (183 metres) above sea level. Ilara Yewa is about 50 kilometers by road from Ketu, a major trading town in Benin. The second-largest settlement, Ilara, merges into Kanga in Benin.

History

Settlement 
Ilara-Yewa is an offshoot community of Ketu, a town situated in the present-day Benin Republic. History has it that, Ketu people migrated from Ile-Ife under the leadership of Sopasan (Alaketu), son of Oduduwa, progenitor of the Yoruba race, to found the Ketu Kingdom. Ilara had maintained the affinity with Ketu until Ketu lost Ilara to the British protectorate as a result in boundary demarcation.

Alaketu of Ketu from time immemorial is the prescribed Authority over the Oloola of Ilara chieftaincy matters in towns and the villages of the Ketu speaking people. The town has tow Ruling houses before, but later the elders in the town met and agreed that the ruling houses should increase to four. The names of the Ruling houses are:-Isako Ruling House, Idogbede Ruling House, Otesu Ruling House, Faningbe/Igbaka Ruling House.

Legend 
People under the leadership of Baba Obosu, Aduitan, Ogbe and Dosunmu to mention just a few left Ketu in search of wild-life. On getting to the forest they killed an elephant, and as they opened its stomach they found “Ose Sango and Edun Aara”.  They were amazed and afraid of the turn of events as such they consulted Ifá the oracle who told them not to eat the elephant but bury it instead and settle in that place. The elephant was buried in the forest and they called the name of the place Ogudo and the forest was called Igbo-Ogudo (Ibiti Ogun ni ki ndo abi Tedo), meaning: "the place where Ogun(god of iron) said I should settle".

Colonial years 
The European powers divided West Africa between them at the Berlin Conference of 1884-85. The Ketus had earlier been conquered by Dahomey in 1886, and they went to the French who restored Ketu in 1893 under a protectorate. The flag was hosted. The French colonist asked if there were other communities who wanted to join, which made the Ketus reach out to Ilara during the reign of Regent Alaba Ida the then Alaketu in 1893-1894. She selected some of her chiefs to accompany the colonial Master to Ilara. However, the Ilara people were unwilling to join the French Colony. To signify their interest or displeasure, the flag of French and British was hoisted so that the people should choose the flag of the country they wished to follow. The then Baale Aseje stood up to choose a British flag because they had previously consulted the Oracle Ifá who instructed them to go with the British. The Alaketu delegates were furious about the decision of the Ilara people and decided that, since Ilara had has chosen to follow British against the wishes of Alaketu the prescribing authority over Ilara, the British flag would be hoisted at her backyard. That is why Ilara was divided.

Governance 
The Imeko-Afon local government was created from the old Egbado North local government in December 1996, during the military regime of General Sani Abacha. Chief Lawrence Sunday Fatokun was the first Executive Chairman of Imeko Afon Local government an indigen of Ilara Indigenes from the town include the Hon Owolabi Àsàmú, member of the House of Representatives, Abuja 1999-2003 under the SDP party.

Councilors 
1. Late. Pa Adeluyi the grandfather of the late Oloola.
2. Late. Pa Osunleke Emmanuel.
3. Hon.Chief Bankole Moses Akanni.The Asiwaju of Ketu land
4. Late. Pa Chief Ogunjobi Samuel the first Oluwo and member Caretaker committee of then Ketu Local government, Tata Local Government area Ogun State.
5. Hon Adéyemí Peter, Imeko-Afon LGA.
Hon Adéyemí Peter, won the best CDA award for Ilara in 2006 when he constructed the palace for Oloola of Ilara.
6. Hon Fakeye Yaya councilor for Ilara Ward.
7. Hon Gbadebo councilor for Ilara.
8. Hon Falola Adegbenro
9. Hon Yusuf Samond.
10. The present councilor is Hon Sola Kugbakin 2021 till date

Economy 
Due to its location, the people of Ilara are mostly traders who engage in international trade between Nigeria and Benin. Farming is another economic activity. The wild vegetation is a mixture of Savannah belt and sparse forest. The climate is tropical with the rainy season commencing around March and ending in November. The soil is fertile for tomatoes, cucumber, golden melon, cocoa, cassava, and other crops like pepper, maize, groundnuts, yam, and teak-timber. There has been a market in the town since about 1898.

Culture and community 
Among the annual cultural festival are Oro, Gelede, Bolojo, Iwe cultural Dance, Kete, Sakara, ere Olode, Egungun. The Egungun (masquerade) festival kicks off with “Agan” night (usually on Friday). The following Saturday witness the Egungun parade from their groove “Igbo-Igbale or Igbo-Oje” located at the outskirt of the town, round the major street in a long single queue.

For the Oro festival women are forbidden to come out throughout the festivities, usually three Saturdays in a Year. The Iwe cultural dance is organized by men and women of the same age group to entertain the community on a chosen day of the year. Common attire is chosen and worn on the day. Men use black horse tail for the dance while the women dig it with locally made hand fans.

The Ilara people are fond of "Amala" locally called "Oka" (made from cassava flour), "Tuwo" locally called "Lagba" (made with maize flour), pounded yam, and eko, "Opoporu" soup commonly called "Obe Oodun" is peculiar to the people and the soup is common especially during the festivals. The "Efo-Yarin/Efo-Iyanrin/ Agumata" is the people choice especially when they are to eat "Eko" Imoyo, is prepared by slicing raw tomatoes, onions, peppers mixed with locust beans (Iru) smoke fish or meat.

Villages and areas under Ilara-Yewa

Kanga (Benin)
Alagbe 
Ijumu 
Oke-Odo
Idisen-en
Sakara 
Yeye
Agbaluka 
Alakuta
Ogelete 
Daramola
Igbo Osun 
Igboimoki
Aitedo
Igbo-Ogudo 
Odò
Atan-Efun

Areas and communities
Agbogi
Isokia
Iyamata
Imalefalafia
Olorunsogo
Ajegunle
Ajelanwa
Lafenwa
Oloruntele
Oke-Agbede

Education 
The town has two public secondary schools namely: Community High Ilara, established in 1980 and Muslim high School Agbogi, Ilara. The town has two community-based secondary the project been financed solely from the funds locally generated: United Christian College Ajegunle Ilara, and Ajoda Community Grammar School Oke-Odo, Idi-Seen Ilara. There are four public primaries school, namely Methodist Primary School Ilara Ata-Ijoun Road, St John Catholic School Ilara, Muslim Primary School Ilara, Community Primary Ilara Atan-Efun, Ilara. Both Methodist and Catholic Primary School are split into Schools School I & II. The town has two community-owned primary schools still awaiting government takeover; they are Oloola community Primary School Ilara, and Ilara-Ogudo Community Primary School Isokia, Ilara.

There are two private Government Approved Primary and Secondary School in Ilara they are: Iranlowo Oluwa Nursery & Primary School, Living Grace Nursery & Primary School, Fatokun Memorial College Ilara and Living Grace secondary School, Ilara. There are two Primary Schools in Benin side of the town Ecole Primaire Scolaire du Benin Kanga, Ilara and Igbo-Ogudo, Ilara. One Secondary School CEG Ecole Secondaire du Benin Kobejo Road Ilara.

Religion 
There is mutual understanding between the adherents of the three main religions in town, Christianity, Islam and traditional Yoruba religion. The Methodist Church Nigeria was the first church in town around 1915 the mission established the Primary School in 1935. Followed by Catholic Mission of St. John Catholic Church which equally established school known as St.John Catholic School in about 1957 and Christ Apostolic Church in 1971 then another Church follows. The Muslim community came in some years later and the first chief Imam was Kazeem from Igbaka quarters.

The traditional cultural activities predominantly among Ilara people are typical of the Ketu speaking people. In term of traditional religion virtually all the major deities of the Yoruba i.e Ogun, Sango, Osun, Ifa, and others are worshipped in the community. However, the Aagbona, Ogun-Oko, Ogun-Imasa, Orisa-Gbongbo are peculiar to the community. The Aagbona is the central shrine. The Ogun-Oko is symbolized by a heavy stone place upon the three wooden pillars at the major junction in Ilara, (Kanga Ilara Benin side), from this point the Iwe-Odun cultural dance kicks off to the other part of the town. The orisa Gbongbo equally falls to Benin side and is located along a major road to Kobejo. It is taboo to pass along the street without paying homage to it. So passer-by singing its praise bending and standing upright rhythmically along with the Orisagbongbo shrine site.

Notable people 

Late Adukanle the Baale 1936 -1975
Late Chief Arikanki Oguntade the Eesaba 1937-1983
Late Chief Kehinde Fadunsin the Balógun,
 Late Chief Kugbakin the Odofin of Ilara 
 Late Chief Lawrence Sunday Fatokun The First Executive Chairman Of IMeko-Afon Local Government, Ogun State
 Late Oba Samuel Alabi Adeluyi (The First Oloola of Ilara) 1983-2020 Chief Moses.Akanni Bankole. The Asiwauju of Ilara, and Asiwaju of Ketu Land. 
 Hon Tosin Adeluyi The Immediate Past Chairmasn Of Imeko-Afon Local Government.
These people were installed in 1978 during the reign of Chief Adukanle the Baale Of Ilara then.
 and chief Àlàyé Joseph the Ẹkẹrin.

Ilara-Ogudo Anthem

*Oloyee pa
Ekun o
Onigbajare mu o
Ina boo okunkun Biri Biri
Isana lekule gbo
Ekun eye idi fule fule
Ekun nba mu nma se.

References

Sources

The Ketu Mission, 1853-1859 [article]
B. Adediran Journalist of African 1986
The History presented at Program of event 17th Edition Ilara-ogudo Festival 2018

External links 
 Brief Youtube video about Ilara-Yewa

Local Government Areas in Ogun State